The Red Bull RB11 is a Formula One racing car designed by Adrian Newey for Infiniti Red Bull Racing to compete in the 2015 Formula One season. It was driven by Daniel Ricciardo and Daniil Kvyat. This was the last Red Bull car with engines originally badged as "Renault" and to feature their title sponsor Infiniti as they split from Red Bull at the end of the season due to a breakdown in the team's relationship with Renault.

The RB11 was launched on 1 February 2015. During pre-season testing, the car ran a camouflage livery – akin to pre-production cars – before the team reverted to their normal livery for the race season.

After good results in previous seasons, 2015 was not a successful season for Red Bull. This was mainly due to the Renault engine lacking performance and reliability, compared to the Mercedes and Ferrari power units. They were also unable to compete with Mercedes as they did in 2014, and also lost out to Ferrari and Williams, finishing fourth overall in the Constructors' Championship. The team suffered their first winless season since 2008, with the best results being 2nd for Kvyat in Hungary and Ricciardo in Singapore.

Competitiveness and performance
Red Bull had a terrible start to the 2015 Formula One season with a lack of performance from its Renault power unit compounded by reliability problems. Red Bull and Renault both stated that they seemed to have 'moved backwards' in performance terms from the previous year. After the first four races, Red Bull still continued to struggle for reliability and performance, only scoring 23 points, the team's worst start since the 2008 Formula One season. Under the current regulations, drivers are permitted to use only four engines per season.

Renault countered with their own threat to pull out of Formula One as an engine supplier if its reputation continued to be damaged or was otherwise not profitable to the company. Red Bull had targeted the Spanish Grand Prix where it would make a step forward on performance due to multiple aerodynamic upgrades, but in the end no results had come thus far as both drivers still finished a lap down on Mercedes and Ferrari. Renault quoted that past glories may have led to present woes with both Red Bull and Renault struggling with power unit reliability and aerodynamic upgrades. Ultimately, the team slumped to 4th place in the Constructors' Championship, with no wins for the first time since 2008. The team's best place was 2nd place each for Kvyat at Hungary and Ricciardo at Singapore on the tracks which suited more to the aerodynamics of the car rather than outright speed. Overall, the chassis proved to be at most on par with the dominant Mercedes  team, but the engine proved to be a letdown to the car's performance.

Complete Formula One results
(key) (results in bold indicate pole position; results in italics indicate fastest lap)

† Driver failed to finish the race, but was classified as they had completed greater than 90% of the race distance.

References

2015 Formula One season cars
Red Bull RB11